"Whatever" is a song released in 2005 by American R&B/soul singer-songwriter Jill Scott, from her album Beautifully Human: Words and Sounds Vol. 2. Scott scored her biggest dance charting song on Billboard's Dance Chart.

Track listing
US CD" Promo

Charts

References

2005 singles
Jill Scott (singer) songs
2004 songs
Songs written by Jill Scott (singer)
Hidden Beach Recordings singles